"Ocho Kandelikas" ( 'Eight Little Candles') is a Ladino song celebrating the holiday of Hanukkah, written by the Jewish-American composer Flory Jagoda in 1983.

The song is sung in Ladino, an Old Spanish-derived language traditionally associated with the Sephardic Jewish community. The song is often performed in an Argentine tango-rhythm with accompanying accordion and violins. The lyrics of the song describe a child's joy of lighting the candles on the menorah. 

The song has been recorded and performed by:
 Sarah Aroeste, an American singer and composer on the album Hanuká 
 Voice of the Turtle (appearing on their CD: Circle of Fire; Boston 1986)
 Erran Baron Cohen
 Portland-based lounge orchestra Pink Martini
 Multilingual rock group Hip Hop Hoodios
 London-based jazz flamenco group Los Desterrados
 Female Acappella ensemble Vocolot
 chazzan Alberto Mizrahi
 Yasmin Levy, an Israeli singer-songwriter of Ladino music
 Idina Menzel, an American actress, performer, singer and songwriter
 Bella Ríos, Cuban-Canadian musician, singer, and songwriter.

Lyrics

References

Hanukkah music
Judaeo-Spanish-language songs
1983 songs
2021 songs